Nagin Aur Suhagin is a 1979 Bollywood adventure film directed by Shantilal Soni.

Cast
Vijay Arora...  Anand Singh 
Rita Bhaduri ...  Gauri J. Singh / Kamla (as Rheeta Baduri) 
Mahesh Bhatt   
Laxmi Chhaya ...  Naag Kanya 
Harita Dave  
Devyani ...  Gauri's sister-in-law 
Kalpana Divan   
C.S. Dubey ...  Thakur Zoravar Singh 
Jairaj ...  Thakur Jagatpal Singh 
Baby Minal ...  Young Geeta 
Mulraj Rajda   
Geera Shah   
Jagdish Shah   
Namita Shah ...  Geeta 
Baby Suparna ...  Young Gauri

Soundtrack

External links
 

1979 films
1970s Hindi-language films
Films about snakes
Films about shapeshifting